Grass Island is a conspicuous island lying across the entrance to Stromness Harbour in Stromness Bay, South Georgia. It was known as "Mutton Island" as early as 1912, but since 1920 the name Grass Island has been consistently used.

On the 22 and 23 April 1982, after a British Special Boat Service team had been driven back by snow at Cumberland East Bay, as part of Operation Paraquet a Troop of the Special Air Service was landed on Grass Island from HMS Antrim, and set up an observation post in preparations for an attack on Argentine positions.

In 2000, the island became rat-free after a team from New Zealand helped in an extermination.

See also 
 Composite Antarctic Gazetteer
 List of Antarctic islands north of 60° S
 Scientific Committee on Antarctic Research

References

Islands of South Georgia
Falklands War in South Georgia